The Österreichische Volks-Zeitung  emerged from the Konstitutionellen Vorstadt-Zeitung (16 April 1865 – 31 May 1874) and was published from 19 August 1888 to 13 November 1918. It was published daily in a format of approx. 40 × 30 cm (2°). The imprint names Gustav Hinterhuber as editor and Wilhelm Feldbaum as printer.

From 1 April 1905, a subsidiary edition appeared – the "Kleine österreichische Volkszeitung", which was also published until 13 November 1918.

The Österreichische Volks-Zeitung was continued under the title Kleine Volkszeitung (1918–1944).

References

External links  
 

Mass media in Austria
Publications established in 1888
Publications disestablished in 1918